A Stroll in the Pork is a 1992 EP released by Raymond Watts (as PIG), originally released in the United States by Concrete Records and in the United Kingdom by Contempo Records. It was re-released in 1998 in Japan by Blue Noise Records.

Track listing

UK version 
 "Death Rattle 'n' Roll" (Raymond Watts) – 4:56
 "Hello Hooray (Extra Large)" (Rolf Kemp) – 4:34
 "Sondero Luminoso" (R. Watts) – 5:05
 "Gravy Train (Revisited)" (R. Watts) – 3:45
 "Watts" (R. Watts, Michael Watts) – 5:45
 "Hello Hooray (Regular)" – 5:12

US version 
 "Hello Hooray (Extra Large)" – 4:36
 "Death Rattle 'n' Roll" – 4:56
 "High Protein" (R. Watts, Anna Wildsmith) – 4:50
 "Gravy Train (Revisited)" – 3:40
 "Sondero Luminoso" – 5:06
 "Sick City (Live)" (R. Watts) – 4:17
 "Watts" – 5:44
 "Hello Hooray (Regular)" – 5:11

Japanese re-release 
 "Death Rattle 'n' Roll" – 4:56
 "Gravy Train (Revisited)" – 3:41
 "Sondero Luminoso" – 5:08
 "Hello Hooray (Regular)" – 5:13
 "Sick City (Live)" – 4:17
 "Infinite Power" (R. Watts) – 4:07
 "Watts" – 5:46
 "Veterano" (R. Watts) – 4:47
 "High Protein" – 4:51
 "Hello Hooray (Extra Large)" – 4:35

Personnel 
Raymond Watts
Michael Watts – keyboards ("Hello Hooray", "Watts")
Steve Crittel – guitars ("Hello Hooray", "Death Rattle 'n' Roll", "Sick City")
Kevin Bass – drums ("Sick City")
Jim McKechnie – samplers ("Sick City")

References 

Pig (musical project) albums
1992 albums